John Boles (October 28, 1895 – February 27, 1969) was an American singer and actor best known for playing Victor Moritz in the 1931 film Frankenstein.

Early life
Boles was born in Greenville, Texas to a middle-class family. He graduated from the University of Texas in 1917. Boles served in the intelligence service of the U.S. Army during World War I. He returned to Greenville, where he was selected by an out-of-town producer to act in an opera at the King Opera House. This experience convinced John that he preferred music and the stage to the preference of his parents, who wanted him to pursue a medical degree.

While en route to a career as actor and singer, Boles earned a living by teaching French and singing in a high school in New York state and working as business manager and interpreter for a one-year tour of Europe by a student group. The latter venture led to his studying under tenor Jean de Reszke.

Personal life
Boles married Marcelite Dobbs (1896-1982) in 1917, and they remained married until his death; they are interred at Westwood Memorial Park in Los Angeles.

Career

He started out in Hollywood in silent movies, but became a huge star with the advent of talkies. After the war, Boles moved to New York to study music. He quickly became well known for his talents and was selected to replace the leading man in the 1923 Broadway musical Little Jesse James. He became an established star on Broadway and attracted the attention of Hollywood producers and actors.

Boles' Broadway credits include One Touch of Venus (1943), Kitty's Kisses (1925), Mercenary Mary (1924), and Little Jessie James (1923).

He was hired by MGM to appear in a silent film in 1924. He starred in two more films for that studio before returning to New York and the stage. In 1927, he returned to Hollywood to star in The Love of Sunya (1927) opposite Gloria Swanson, which was a big success for him. Unfortunately, because the movies were still silent he was unable to show off his singing ability until late in the decade. In 1929, Warner Brothers hired him to star in their lavish musical operetta The Desert Song (1929). This film featured sequences in Technicolor and was a box-office success. Soon after, Radio Pictures (later known as RKO) selected him to play the leading man in their extravagant production (the last portion of the film was photographed in Technicolor) of Rio Rita, opposite Bebe Daniels. Audiences were enthralled by his beautiful voice, and John Boles suddenly found himself in huge demand. RCA Victor even hired him to make phonograph records of songs that he had sung in his films.

As soon as Rio Rita was completed, Boles went back to Warner Brothers as the leading man in an even more extravagant musical entitled Song of the West (1930) that was filmed entirely in Technicolor. Shortly after this film, Universal Pictures offered John Boles a contract, which he accepted. He starred in a number of pictures for them, most notably the all-Technicolor musical revue entitled The King of Jazz (1930) and a historical operetta entitled Captain of the Guard (1930). In 1931, he starred in One Heavenly Night (1931), which would prove to be his last major musical.

Boles portrayed Victor Moritz in Frankenstein (1931). He starred with Irene Dunne in a 1934 film adaptation of Edith Wharton's 1920 novel The Age of Innocence directed for RKO Radio Pictures by Philip Moeller, and took the role of Edward Morgan in Curly Top (1935), starring Shirley Temple. In 1937, Boles starred alongside Barbara Stanwyck in the King Vidor classic Stella Dallas. In 1943, he co-starred with Mary Martin and Kenny Baker in One Touch of Venus.

Later years
Boles retired from the screen and stage in 1952, after starring opposite Paulette Goddard in Babes in Baghdad. He later went into the oil business and lived the last 13 years of his life in San Angelo, Texas.

For his contributions to the film industry, Boles was inducted into the Hollywood Walk of Fame in 1960 with a motion pictures star located at 6530 Hollywood Boulevard.

Death
Boles died on February 27, 1969, in San Angelo, Texas, at age 73.

Partial filmography

So This Is Marriage? (1924) - Uriah
Excuse Me (1925) - Lt. Shaw
The Love of Sunya (1927) - Paul Judson
The Shepherd of the Hills (1928) - Young Matt
 We Americans (1928) - Hugh Bradleigh
Fazil (1928) - John Clavering
 Virgin Lips (1928) - Barry Blake
The Water Hole (1928) - Bert Durland
Man-Made Women (1928) - John Payson
Romance of the Underworld (1928) - Stephen Ransome
The Bride of the Colorado (1928) - John Barrows
The Last Warning (1929) - Richard Quayle
The Desert Song (1929) - The Red Shadow
Scandal (1929) - Maurice
Rio Rita (1929) - Captain Jim Stewart
Song of the West (1930) - Captain Stanton
Captain of the Guard (1930) - Rouget de Lisle
King of Jazz (1930) - Vocalist ('Song of the Dawn' / 'It Happened in Monterey')
Resurrection (1931) - Prince Dmitri Nekhludoff
Seed (1931) - Bart Carter
Frankenstein (1931) - Victor Moritz
Good Sport (1931) - Boyce Cameron
Careless Lady (1932) - Stephen Illington
Back Street (1932) - Walter D. Saxel
Six Hours to Live (1932) - Karl Kranz
Child of Manhattan (1933) - Paul
My Lips Betray (1933) - King Rupert aka Captain von Linden
Only Yesterday (1933) - James Stanton 'Jim' Emerson
Beloved (1934) - Carl Hausmann
I Believed in You (1934) - Michael Harrison
Bottoms Up (1934) - Hal Reed
Stand Up and Cheer! (1934) - Himself
Wild Gold (1934) - Steve Miller
The Life of Vergie Winters (1934) - John Shadwell
The Age of Innocence (1934) - Newland Archer
The White Parade (1934) - Ronald Hall III
Music in the Air (1934) - Bruno Mahler
Curly Top (1935) - Edward Morgan
Orchids to You (1935) - Thomas Bentley
Redheads on Parade (1935) - John Bruce
The Littlest Rebel (1935) - Capt. Herbert Cary
Rose of the Rancho (1936) - Jim Kearney
A Message to Garcia (1936) - Lieutenant Andrew Rowan
Craig's Wife (1936) - Walter Craig
As Good as Married (1937) - Alexander Drew
Stella Dallas (1937) - Stephen Dallas
Fight for Your Lady (1937) - Robert Densmore
She Married an Artist (1937) - Lee Thornwood
Romance in the Dark (1938) - Antal Kovach
Sinners in Paradise (1938) - Jim Taylor
Road to Happiness (1941) - Jeff Carter
Between Us Girls (1942) - Steven J. Forbes
Thousands Cheer (1943) - Col. Bill Jones
Babes in Bagdad (1952) - Hassan
Muchachas de Bagdad (1952) - Hassan (final film role)

Notes

References

External links

https://www.playbill.com/person/john-boles-vault-0000111975

Photographs of John Boles

1895 births
1969 deaths
20th-century American male actors
American male film actors
American male silent film actors
Burials at Westwood Village Memorial Park Cemetery
People from Greenville, Texas
University of Texas alumni
RCA Victor artists